Ricardo Argentino Supisiche (November 6, 1912 – November 6, 1992) was an Argentine painter and engraver.

Supisiche was born in Santa Fe, the capital of Santa Fe Province, in 1912. He studied drawing at the José María Reinares Academy in his home city, and under master Sergio Sergi at Santa Fe's Municipal Lyceum. He began painting in 1936 and continued his studies during a journey to Europe in 1951, where he stayed in Italy for several months. Supisiche's works earned him numerous awards, and he taught drawing and painting techniques in several institutions.

References

External links

 Asociación Trabajadores del Estado.
 Los Coleccionistas.

Argentine engravers
Argentine people of Croatian descent
1912 births
1992 deaths
People from Santa Fe, Argentina
20th-century Argentine painters
Argentine male painters
20th-century Argentine male artists
20th-century engravers